Rowan Alexander Barrett Sr. (born November 24, 1972) is a Canadian former professional basketball player. At a height of 1.98 m (6'6") tall, he played at the shooting guard and small forward positions. He was the top scorer in the 2002 Israel Basketball Premier League. He currently serves as general manager of the Canadian men's national team.

High school career
Born in the Scarborough district of Toronto, Ontario, Barrett attended West Hill Collegiate Institute, where he played high school basketball.

College career
Barrett played NCAA Division I college basketball at St. John's University, with the St. John's Red Storm, from 1992 to 1996.

Professional career
Barrett was under contract with the Toronto Raptors (1997 and 1999), and Philadelphia 76ers (1999), but he never played in any NBA regular season games with those teams.

Some of the clubs that Barrett played professionally for include: in Spain with Etosa Alicante (2nd Division) (1997–98), in Argentina with Boca Juniors (1998–99), in Venezuela with Cocodrilos de Caracas (1999, 2001, 2003), in Cyprus with Keravnos Keo (2000–01), in Greece with Dafni (2001), in Israel with Maccabi Rishon LeZion (2002), Hapoel Haifa (2002), and Ramat HaSharon (2002–03), in France with JDA Dijon Basket (2003–05), ASVEL Lyon-Villeurbanne (2006–07), and Élan Chalon (2007–08), and in Italy with Vertical Vision Cantù (2005–06). 

He was the top scorer in the 2002 Israel Basketball Premier League, scoring 25.5 points per game on 57% two-point shooting and 41% three-point shooting, as he added 5.2 rebounds per game; his one-game highs were 42 points and 10 rebounds. He was the top scorer of the European-wide 2nd-tier level league, the FIBA Saporta Cup, in the 2000–01 season.

National team career
Barrett played for the senior Canadian national basketball team. With Canada, he played at the 1998 FIBA World Championship, the 2000 Summer Olympic Games, and the 2002 FIBA World Championship. He also played at the 1993 FIBA AmeriCup, the 1997 FIBA AmeriCup, the 1999 FIBA AmeriCup, and the 2003 FIBA AmeriCup.

He also played at the 1999 Pan American Games and the 2003 Pan American Games.

Executive career
Barrett is currently Executive Vice President and General Manager of Canada Basketball.

Personal life
Barrett's son, RJ Barrett, was ranked as the number one high-school basketball player in the class of 2018, and enrolled at Duke University for a year before being selected 3rd overall by the New York Knicks in the 2019 NBA draft.

References

External links
EuroCup Profile
FIBA Profile
FIBA Europe Profile
Eurobasket.com Profile
Italian League Profile 
Greek Basket League Profile 
French League Profile 
Israeli Super League Profile

1972 births
Living people
1998 FIBA World Championship players
2002 FIBA World Championship players
ASVEL Basket players
Basketball players at the 1999 Pan American Games
Basketball players at the 2003 Pan American Games
Basketball players from Toronto
Black Canadian basketball players
Boca Juniors basketball players
Canadian expatriate basketball people in France
Canadian expatriate basketball people in Greece
Canadian expatriate basketball people in Italy
Canadian expatriate basketball people in the United States
Canadian expatriate sportspeople in Argentina
Canadian expatriate sportspeople in Israel
Canadian expatriate sportspeople in Venezuela
Canadian expatriate sportspeople in Cyprus
Canadian people of Jamaican descent
CB Lucentum Alicante players
Cocodrilos de Caracas players
Dafnis B.C. players
Élan Chalon players
Hapoel Haifa B.C. players
JDA Dijon Basket players
Keravnos B.C. players
Maccabi Rishon LeZion basketball players
Olympic basketball players of Canada
Pallacanestro Cantù players
Pan American Games competitors for Canada
Shooting guards
Small forwards
Sportspeople from Scarborough, Toronto
St. John's Red Storm men's basketball players
Universiade bronze medalists for Canada
Universiade medalists in basketball
Universiade silver medalists for Canada
Medalists at the 1995 Summer Universiade